Anahita Dargahi (born ) is an Iranian actress and painter.

Early life 
Anahita Dargahi was born in 1987 in Tehran. She began painting at the age of seven under the instruction of the renowned painter Abbas Katouzian. Having gained accomplishment in her painting career, Dargahi has held a number of individual exhibitions while taking part actively in several group ones both in Iran and abroad. She has also designed numerous posters. While a painter and an actor, she was the producer of the music video Parde-ye Ākhar (The Last Act) by Reza Kianian as well as one of Arian Keshishi's concerts.

Dargahi is a stage and movie actress. She learned her first lessons in acting from Farzad Motamen who gave her a part in his movie Ākharin bār key Sahar rā didi? (When Did You Meet Sahar Last?) in 2015.

Dargahi continued with her academic education in art and did a B.A. in graphics as well as an M.A. in painting from Tehran University of Art.

She married the actor, singer, and director Ashkan Khatibi in 2016.

Career

Painting

Dargahi has held three individual exhibitions of her works at the Niavaran Palace Complex and Seyhoun Gallery and Farmanieh Galleries, all in Tehran. She has also taken part in three group exhibitions at the Museum of Fine Arts of the Sa’dabad Palace Complex, Kamal-ol-Molk Gallery, and Jam Art Gallery in Dubai. Her latest painting exhibition called “Fasl-e man kojāst?” (“Where Is My Season?”) was held at Ariana Gallery.

Acting
Dargahi's acting debut was the detective movie  (When Did You Met Sahar Last?), directed by Farzad Motamen in 2015. Nominated in five categories at the Fajr International Film Festival, the movie brought her to the limelight.

She also starred in the TV series  (The Forbidden, by Amir Purkian, 2017) as "Talā Davallou".

Dargahi took roles in a number of plays including  (Waiting for Adolf, by Alireza Koushk Jalali, 2017),  (The Three Sisters, by Mohammad-Hasan Ma'jouni, 2017),  (Ten Years of Solitude, by Ashkan Khatibi, 2018),  (The Famine-stricken, by Ashkan Khatibi, 2019).

Filmography

Film

 The Loser Man (Mohammad Hossein Mahdavian, 2022)
  (Keyvan Alimohammadi and Ali-Akbar Heydari, 2019)
  (Hosein Soheilizadeh, 2019)
  (Amin Aslani, 2019)
  (Mohammad Ali Sadjadi, 2018)
  (Farzad Motamen, 2018)
  (Rambod Javan, 2018)
  (short film) (Ali Zarnegar, 2017)
  (Amir Eskandari, 2017)
  (Mostafa Taghizadeh, 2016)
  (Farzad Motamen, 2015)

Web

Theatre 
  (Ashkan Khatibi, Iranshahr Amphitheater, Samandarian Hall, June 2019)
  (Mikaeel Shahrestani, based on Mr Puntila and his Man Matti, an epic theatre comedy by Bertolt Brecht)
  (stage reading of a play by Harold Pinter)
  (Ali Shams)
  (Alireza Koushk Jalali)
  (Mohammad-Hasan Ma'jouni, Pāliz Amphitheater, June 2017, based on a play be Anton Chekhov)
  theater-concerto (Ashkan Khatibi)

References

External links 

 

1987 births
Living people
People from Tehran
Actresses from Tehran
Iranian women painters
Iranian film actresses
Iranian stage actresses
Iranian television actresses
21st-century Iranian actresses